is a private university in Higashi-ku of Fukuoka, Fukuoka Prefecture, Japan. The predecessor of the school was founded in 1954, and it was chartered as a university in 1963. It is located near Fukkōdaimae Station.

Alumni
 Ichirō Matsui, governor of Osaka Prefecture and secretary general of the Osaka Restoration Association, attended the university.

References

External links

 Official website

Educational institutions established in 1954
Private universities and colleges in Japan
Engineering universities and colleges in Japan
Universities and colleges in Fukuoka Prefecture
1954 establishments in Japan